Kwanza Jones is an American artist, investor, entrepreneur and philanthropist. She was born in Los Angeles, California. Jones started her singing career after performing and winning Amateur Night at the Apollo Theater while in college at Princeton University. Her philanthropy, investments and artistry focus on empowerment, education, equity and entrepreneurship.

Biography 
Jones was born in Los Angeles, California on Thanksgiving Day. In her youth, she played the flute, violin, and piano, as well as sang in choirs at school and church; she also ran track and field throughout high school and college.  In addition to her arts and athletics, Jones served on the D.C. State Board of Education as an elected Student Member.  Her paternal great-grandmother played piano for famous blues singer Bessie Smith.

Jones attended Princeton University, in Princeton, New Jersey. Her focus was interdisciplinary as she majored in Public and International Affairs at the Princeton School of Public and International Affairs. While there she was in an a cappella group, a soloist in the gospel choir, and in an electronica band. She had a chance meeting with music legend Quincy Jones which piqued her interest in music as a profession. After graduating from Princeton, Jones was Miss Baltimore. She has a J.D. degree from Benjamin N. Cardozo School of Law and a Master of Dispute Resolution from Pepperdine University School of Law.

Music career 
Jones started her singing career after performing and winning Amateur Night at the Apollo Theater while in college at Princeton University. Her debut album, Naked, was conceived while she was attending Princeton University. At this time, she played a lot in bars and other small venues. Her biggest performance during this time was at the World Famous Apollo Theater in New York.

When she graduated she decided to travel a little and wrote her second album Naked 2: universal fire. Along with original material, this album also featured two cover songs, The Doors' "Light My Fire" and Ashford & Simpson's "Ain't No Mountain High Enough".

When she arrived back in the US, she moved to Los Angeles to continue her music career.

Jones' song "Think Again" earned her first appearance on the Billboard charts. She debut at No. 47 on the Billboard Hot Dance/Club Play Charts. In December 2010, it was No. 3 on the Biggest Jump list. In February 2011, it peaked at No. 21 on the Billboard charts.  "Think Again – The Remixes" is a Dance project featuring the single, "Think Again" where Kwanza collaborated with Grammy nominated American DJ/producer/remixer, Mike Rizzo. Also working with her on this project was DJ Lynnwood and Jaime J Sanchez. This project was released on November 26, 2010. All of Jones' music has been release on her independent label Innovation Entertainment. Jones' most recent studio album, is Supercharged; she has released numerous singles since then.

Philanthropy 
Jones is the Co-Founder and CEO of the Kwanza Jones & José E. Feliciano Initiative, a grant making and impact investment organization. She is also the Founder of SUPERCHARGED by Kwanza Jones, a motivational media company.

Jones has served on the board of directors of national organizations like  Susan G. Komen, where she pushed them to diversify both their leadership and their programming.

In 2022, Jones donated $30,000 to WRRAP, PFLAG, and Girls Inc. following the release of her music video "Queen Moves Only, Mother's Day Mix." These 3 organizations aligned with the mission and message behind the song.

In 2021, Jones served on the board of the Apollo Theater.

In 2020, Jones announced a $20 million gift to Princeton University to help expand the student body and in support of access and inclusion.

In 2020, Jones wrote an Open Love Letter to Princeton to help remove Woodrow Wilson name off buildings.

In 2019, Jones announced a donation of $1 million to Bennett College, one of the single largest grants in Bennett College's history.

In 2019, Jones joined the board of directors of Susan G. Komen, the world's leading breast cancer organization.

In 2019, Jones released "Problem," leading up the 2020 elections, a music video style public service announcement that addressed injustice, racial profiling, and issues that impact women and other historically marginalized people.

In 2017, Jones responded to the humanitarian crisis in Puerto Rico after Hurricane Maria hit the island. She was an anchor sponsor supporting recovery efforts, including resources, relief, and rebuilding. She has also supported the United Way as a member of the Tocqueville Society.

In 2010, Jones joined artists Beyoncé Knowles, Sinéad O'Connor, Halle Berry, Mary J. Blige, and others, in support of Girls Educational and Mentoring Services' (GEMS) campaign, "Girls Are Not for Sale." This is a national campaign committed to ending the commercial sexual exploitation and trafficking of girls and young women.

Charts and awards

Discography

Tours 
 Gladiators "Я” Vicious Tour (2013)
 Bring The Heat Tour (2012)
 Girls 4 Boys Tour (2011)

References

External links 
 KwanzaJones.com

Living people
African-American women singer-songwriters
American women philanthropists
Members of the District of Columbia Board of Education
Philanthropists from Washington, D.C.
Princeton University alumni
Women philanthropists
Year of birth missing (living people)
21st-century African-American women singers
Singer-songwriters from Washington, D.C.